Statistics of Turkish First Football League in the 1996/1997 season.

Overview
It was contested by 18 teams, and Galatasaray S.K. won the championship. Sarıyer G.K., Denizlispor and Zeytinburnuspor relegated to Second League.

League table

Results

Top scorers

References

Turkey - List of final tables (RSSSF)

Süper Lig seasons
1996–97 in Turkish football
Turkey